Emerson College, UK was founded in 1962 by Francis Edmunds. It is now situated on Pixton Hill, Forest Row in East Sussex, UK. It was named after Ralph Waldo Emerson, American poet and transcendentalist. For the past c.60 years there has been an international community of students, teachers, and researchers living and studying on the site inspired by the philosophy and teachings of Rudolf Steinerwhich he called Anthroposophy.  A book on the history of Emerson College was published in 2013.

Courses 
Emerson has been a nest for different courses like Waldorf Teacher Training, Anthroposophical Foundation year, Holistic care, Biodynamic Agriculture, Visual and Performing Arts and Storytelling and so on. At the moment the stronger courses are Storytelling and Visual Arts.

Research 
The Flow Design Research Group at the college collaborated with Imperial College and the Royal Brompton Hospital on a study of blood flow in the heart.

Further reading 
"The Story of Emerson College: Its Founding Impulse, Work and Form"  - Michael Spence, Temple Lodge Press, 2013.

References

External links
 Official website of Emerson College

Education in East Sussex
Forest Row